The Devil is the fifth studio album by American multi-genre project Blue Stahli, and the second vocal album following Blue Stahli. It was released in chapters, the first of which was released on December 17, 2013. The full album was released on October 2, 2015. The album features guest appearances from Australian musician Emma Anzai of Sick Puppies and American singer Mark Salomon.

Production and release

Work on the album began as early as April, but the album was announced on November 14, when the cover art was released via Facebook, it was revealed that the album would be released in chapters, with two songs per chapter, much like Celldweller's Wish Upon a Blackstar. In an interview, Autrey stated that he wanted to finish and release the album in 2014, but ended up releasing it at a later date.

Chapter 01

On May 31, "Down In Flames" and "The Fall" were confirmed as songs for a new vocal album, and were completed on November 7. Details for the first chapter were later released on November 14, and both songs were confirmed to make up the first chapter, they were made available for pre-order on November 19 and were finally released on December 17.

Chapter 02
Bret confirmed as of April 4, 2014, that the two tracks from Chapter 2 were finished, with both tracks being confirmed as "Enemy" and "Ready, Aim, Fire". In an episode of "Ask Blue Stahli" titled "Ambience", he announced that a new track, later revealed to be "The Beginning", for the second chapter was completed and awaiting release. On June 25, it was announced that Chapter 2 would be released on July 29, 2014, the track listing for Chapter 2 was released two days later. Chapter 02 was released on July 29, 2014, as planned.

Full album
In late August, Bret mentioned working on a new track, "Not Over 'Til We Say So", that would appear on the album. On October 10, in a "Stahlivision" video, Bret revealed that "Not Over 'Til We Say So" was almost done, and that Emma Anzai of Sick Puppies had contributed bass and vocals to the track. It was later released as a single on February 16, 2015.

In an episode of Ask Blue Stahli titled "Sing Like a Lady", he conceded that Chapter 02 was "the last chapter for this album", and that he was now working on releasing the remainder of The Devil as soon as possible.

Vocal work for the album was complete on July 20, 2015, and the tracklist was being arranged.

Track listing

References 

2013 albums
Blue Stahli albums
Albums produced by Joey Sturgis